A Mustache Pete is a member of the Sicilian Mafia who came to the United States (particularly New York City) as an adult in the early 20th century.

History 
Unlike the younger Sicilian-Americans, known as the "Young Turks," the old-guard Mustache Petes had large mustaches and usually committed their first killings in Italy. Their most prominent members were Joe "the Boss" Masseria (1886–1931) and Salvatore Maranzano (1886–1931). Many of them maintained connections with the Sicilian Mafia. The Mustache Petes wanted to maintain Sicilian criminal traditions in their new country and were more interested in working with and exploiting their fellow Italians than the public at large. To that end, they opposed their younger members' desire to work with the powerful Jewish and Irish gangs, and to sell illegal drugs.

This annoyed younger caporegimes, such as Lucky Luciano (1897–1962) and Vito Genovese (1897–1969).
Luciano and other "Young Turks" in the New York Mafia concluded that the Mustache Petes were too set in their ways to see the millions of dollars that working with non-Italian gangsters could bring. During the Castellammarese War (1930–31), Luciano built a network of younger mafiosi in both the Masseria and Maranzano camps who secretly intended to assassinate one of the older bosses, then bide their time before killing the other.

They decided to kill Masseria and feigned loyalty to Maranzano until they had a chance to eliminate him as well. Following the death of Maranzano on September 10, 1931, the newer generation of Italian mobsters reorganized the National Crime Syndicate and founded The Commission, becoming closer to the modern American Mafia.

Journalists marked this day as a purge of older mafiosi, known as the "Night of the Sicilian Vespers." Several days later, on September 13, the corpses of two other Maranzano allies, Samuel Monaco and Louis Russo, were retrieved from Newark Bay, showing evidence of torture. Meanwhile, Joseph Siragusa, leader of the Pittsburgh crime family, was shot to death in his home. The October 15 disappearance of Joe Ardizonne, head of the Los Angeles family, was later regarded as part of this alleged plan to quickly eliminate the old-world Sicilian bosses. However, the idea of an organized mass purge, directed by Luciano, has been debunked as a myth.

References

Further reading

American gangsters of Sicilian descent
Sicilian Mafia
American Mafia
Organized crime terminology